Hla Yin Win (born 20 October 1995) is a Burmese footballer who plays as a forward. She has been a member of the Myanmar women's national team.

International goals

See also
List of Myanmar women's international footballers

References

1995 births
Living people
Women's association football forwards
Burmese women's footballers
People from Ayeyarwady Region
Myanmar women's international footballers